The Bangladesh Premier League (BPL) is a professional Twenty20 league in Bangladesh. The league consists of 7 teams for the first time from seven different cities. This is a list of the squads of all franchise for the 2013 edition.

Dhaka Gladiators
Team roaster of 2013.

Khulna Royal Bengal
Khulna Royal Bengals team roaster for 2013.

Chittagong Kings
Chittagong Kings team roasters for 2013.

Barisal Burners
Barisal Burners team roaster for 2013.

Rangpur Riders
Rangpur Riders team roaster for 2013.

Sylhet Royals
Sylhet Royals team roaster for the season.

Duronto Rajshahi
Duronto Rajshahi team roaster for the season of 2013.

References

2013 Bangladesh Premier League